The 1918 Alabama Crimson Tide football team (variously "Alabama", "UA" or "Bama") was to represent the University of Alabama in the 1918 college football season; however, the season was canceled due to the effects of World War I. B. L. Noojin was to serve as head coach for the season. University officials canceled the season as a result of multiple opponents canceling their contests against Alabama and a military policy that only allowed for the team to practice for less than one hour per week. Alabama also did not field a team in 1898 due to campus rules prohibiting athletic teams from traveling off campus to compete and in 1943 due to the effects of World War II.

Schedule
In December 1917, Alabama released its tentative schedule for the 1918 season. At that time, the Crimson Tide were scheduled to open the season against Kentucky in Tuscaloosa and play Vanderbilt at Dudley Field. In the February that followed, the official schedule was released that featured four games in Tuscaloosa, two in Birmingham and one on the road.

References

Alabama
Alabama Crimson Tide football seasons
Alabama Crimson Tide football